Frank Ellsworth Freeman (December 26, 1879 – September 30, 1952), nicknamed "Buck", was a professional baseball first baseman who played in Major League Baseball for the Washington Senators.

External links

1879 births
1952 deaths
Major League Baseball first basemen
Baseball players from California
Washington Senators (1901–1960) players
Minneapolis Millers (baseball) players
Toledo Mud Hens players
Cleveland Forest City players
People from Placerville, California
Seattle Chinooks players